The Velosure Giordana Pro Cycling Team are a British UCI Continental cycling team.

Profile
The Velosure Giordana cycling team are sponsored by Node4, a Data Centre Services provider. The team rides senior professional events in the United Kingdom and Europe, other than the Grand Tours and UCI ProTour races. They also ride track events such as the Revolution.

In 2012 the team changed its name from Motorpoint to Node4-Giordana. In 2014 It became Velosure Giordana

Major wins

2008
Stage 2, 3 & 4 Cinturón a Mallorca, Russell Downing
Abergavenny Criterium, Russell Downing
GP of Wales, Russell Downing
Stage 4 Tour of Ireland, Russell Downing
2009
Stage 3 Cinturón a Mallorca, Russell Downing
Overall Tour of Ireland, Russell Downing
Stage 1, Russell Downing
2010
Stage 1 Cinturón a Mallorca, Ian Bibby
2011
Stage 3 Cinturón a Mallorca, Ian Bibby
Stage 6 An Post Rás, Marcin Białobłocki
2012
Overall BDO Tour of Northland, Michael Northey
Stages 1, 3 & 4, Michael Northey
Overall Irish Sea Tour of the North, James Moss
Stage 1 Tour du Loir-et-Cher, Michael Northey
Shay Elliott Memorial Race, Philip Lavery
Stage 1 An Post Rás, Marcin Białobłocki
Stage 3 Tour of Ulster, Matthew Higgins
Torquay Critrerium, Marcin Białobłocki
Guildford Criterium, James Moss
GP Ville de Pérenchies, Rico Rogers
Newport Criterium, Rico Dene Rogers
Ottershaw Series, David Clarke
Overall Tour of Southland, Michael Northey
Stage 2, Michael Northey
Lake Taupo Cycle Challenge, Michael Northey
Waipara Festival of Cycling, Matt Cronshaw
2013
Rev Classic Cambridge, Shem Rodger
Overall BDO Tour of Northland, Michael Northey
Stages 2 & 4, Michael Northey
Stage 3 Totnes–Vire Stage Race, James Williamson
Wales Open Criterium, Michael James Northey
Grand Prix of Wales, Michael Northey 
Sefton Classic, Daniel Barry
 National Criterium Championship, Michael Northey
2014
Jock Wadley Memorial RR, Robert Partridge
Coalville Wheelers, Steven Lampier
Overall Irish Sea Tour of the North, James Gullen
Wiltshire GP, Marcin Białobłocki
Stage 5 An Post Rás, Marcin Białobłocki

2013 team
As of 15 January 2013.

References

External links

Cycling teams based in the United Kingdom
UCI Continental Teams (Europe)
Cycling teams established in 2008